is a city located in Fukuoka Prefecture, Japan. The city was founded on April 10, 1955.

As of November 1, 2014, the city has an estimated population of 26,100 and a population density of 235 persons per km². The total area is 111.17 km². The yamamomo is the city's tree, and the rhododendron is the city's flower.

Geography

Buzen is located in the southeast corner of Fukuoka Prefecture, Kyushu. To the south of Buzen is Ōita Prefecture and to the northeast is the Suohnada Sea. The town is mostly rural and extends nearly 100 km² inland towards more mountainous terrain.

Education

Vocational School 
Buzen Chikujo Medical Association Nursing Advanced Vocational School

High School 
Fukuoka Prefectural Seiho High School

Junior High School 
Hachiya Junior High School
Suda Junior High School
Chizuka Junior High School
Goiwa Junior High School

Notable facts
The city is the birthplace of the father of Hawaiian Governor George Ariyoshi. As of 2015 George Ariyoshi has made several trips to Buzen to visit family graves and meet with local officials.

Buzen is also the home of the Ootomi Shrine.

See also

Suohnada Sea

References

External links

 Buzen City official website 

 
Cities in Fukuoka Prefecture